Daisy is an unincorporated town in Perry County, Kentucky. The population was 1758 as of the 2000 United States Census, with a population density of 32 per square mile. The area is known historically for its coal mining.

It was the birthplace and hometown of notable American Appalachian musician Roscoe Holcomb.

References 

Unincorporated communities in Kentucky
Unincorporated communities in Perry County, Kentucky
Coal towns in Kentucky